Jindřich Vavrla (born 12 February 1967) is a Czech wrestler. He competed in the men's Greco-Roman 62 kg at the 1992 Summer Olympics.

References

1967 births
Living people
Czech male sport wrestlers
Olympic wrestlers of Czechoslovakia
Wrestlers at the 1992 Summer Olympics
Sportspeople from Ostrava